Roding Valley Meadows is an  biological Site of Special Scientific Interest in Buckhurst Hill in Essex. It is part of a 65.2 hectare Local Nature Reserve with the same name, which is owned by Epping Forest District Council and Grange Farm Trust, and managed by the Essex Wildlife Trust.

The meadows are bordered to the south west by the River Roding. They form one of the largest areas of grassland in Essex which are traditionally managed as hay meadows, flood meadows and marshland. They have a rich variety of plant species, including the largest beds in Essex of the rare brown sedge. The flood meadows have a number of uncommon species, including carex panicea and marsh-marigold. There are nearly ten miles of hedgerows. Management is by hay cutting and grazing by traditional breeds of cattle.

The main car park is on Roding Lane.

References

Local Nature Reserves in Essex
Epping Forest District
Sites of Special Scientific Interest in Essex
Essex Wildlife Trust
Meadows in Essex